Tatiana Repeikina (18 March 1973 – 27  January 2017) was a Russian football goalkeeper, playing for Mordovochka Saransk in the Russian Championship. She won three Russian leagues with Ryazan VDV and Zvezda Perm, and was a reserve in the 2009 UEFA Women's Cup final. She died on 27 January 2017 at the age of 43.

References

1973 births
2017 deaths
Russian women's footballers
Expatriate women's footballers in Ukraine
Expatriate footballers in Azerbaijan
FC Lada Togliatti (women) players
Ryazan-VDV players
Zvezda 2005 Perm players
Sportspeople from Kazan
Women's association football goalkeepers